Al Ishy  is a village in the sub-governorate of Bariq in  the province of Asir, Saudi Arabia.

See also 

 List of cities and towns in Saudi Arabia
 Regions of Saudi Arabia

References 

Populated places in 'Asir Province
Populated coastal places in Saudi Arabia
Populated places in Bareq